Greifswald Süd is a railway station in the town of Greifswald, Mecklenburg-Vorpommern, Germany. The station lies of the Angermünde–Stralsund railway and the train services are operated by DB Regio Nordost and Ostdeutsche Eisenbahn.

Train services
The station is served by the following service(s):
 Stralsund - Greifswald - Pasewalk - Angermünde - Berlin - Ludwigsfelde - Jüterbog - Falkenberg
 Rostock - Stralsund - Greifswald - Züssow

References

Sud Station
Railway stations in Mecklenburg-Western Pomerania
Railway stations in Germany opened in 1970
Buildings and structures in Vorpommern-Greifswald